Big Sir is a band that includes the bass guitarist Juan Alderete (The Mars Volta and Racer X) and the singer Lisa Papineau.

Discography
Big Sir (2000)
Und Die Scheiße Ändert Sich Immer (2006)
Before Gardens After Gardens (2012)
Digital Gardens (2014)

Other releases
Now That's What I Call Big Sir (2001)

References

American rock music groups